Kharwa may refer to:

 Kharwa caste, a fishing community of Gujarat, India
 Kharwa Kala, a village in Ratlam District of Madhya Pradesh, India
 Kharwa, Rajasthan, the former capital of the Panth Piploda province of British India
 Rao Gopal Singh Kharwa (1872–1939), the ruler of the Kharwa, Rajasthan